Elizabeth Willoughby Varian (born Elizabeth Willoughby Treacy also known as Finola; 1821 – 1896) was a poet and nationalist.

Early life
Varian was born in 1821 in Ballymena, Co. Antrim to a unionist family. She was one of three daughters.

Career
From 1850, she published a range of poetry under the pen-name Finola, frequently in The Nation, the Belfast Vindictor, and the Irishman magazine. She was part of the Young Ireland movement, and much of her poetry focused on Irish nationalism and the Irish Home Rule movement and could be described as being part of the traditional Irish nationalist ballad. She advocated for fair treatment of the marginalized as well as the need for Irish self-determination. One of her most famous poems, “The Irish Mother’s Lament” was published in Street Ballads etc in 1865. Another of her poems "Proselytizing" is notable as a contemporary account of the Great Famine of Ireland, published in 1851.

Books
She published her first book, Poems in 1851, followed by Never Forsake The Ship and Other Poems in 1871, and The Political and National Poems of Finola in 1877.

Personal life
On  May 25, 1871, she married Cork poet Ralph Varian.

References

External links
 Ricorso: Elizabeth Willoughby Varian
 Never Forsake the Ship and Other Poems

1821 births
1896 deaths
People from County Antrim
Irish poets